Seridó Ocidental is a microregion in the Brazilian state of Rio Grande do Norte.

Municipalities 
The microregion consists of the following municipalities:
 Caicó
 Ipueira
 Jardim de Piranhas
 São Fernando
 São João do Sabugi
 Serra Negra do Norte
 Timbaúba dos Batistas

References

Microregions of Rio Grande do Norte